Hans Fredrik Jacobsen (born 8 September 1954) is a Norwegian musician and composer, best known for his work with his wife, the traditional folk singer Tone Hulbækmo, and with the medieval music group Kalenda Maya, as well as his concert and studio music on a range of instruments: flute, diatonic button accordion, saxophone and guitar.

Career 
Jacobsen was born, in Risør, but is based in Tolga. He and his wife Tone Hulbækmo are the parents of jazz drummer and vibraphonist Hans Hulbækmo and pianist Alf Hulbækmo. Jacobsen has played with Secret Garden, Halldis Moren Vesaas, Ragnar Bjerkreim, Sondre Bratland, Annbjørg Lien and Henning Sommerro, among others.

Discography 
Langt nord i skogen. 1988   (with Tone Hulbækmo)
Seljefløyta. 1997 (with Steinar Ofsdal and Hallgrim Berg)
Jól. 1998
Vind. 2003
Himalaya blues. 2004 (with Knut Reiersrud and Varja)

Honors 
Spellemannprisen 1988 with Tone Hulbækmo best children's album for Langt nord i skogen
Skjæraasenprisen 2004

External links 
gubemusic.com - artist page on Gube Music.
musikkonline.no

See also 

List of composers

1954 births
Living people
Norwegian composers
Norwegian male composers
Norwegian flautists
Spellemannprisen winners
Musicians from Tolga, Norway
People from Risør
Heilo Music artists